The 10th ASAP Pop Viewers' Choice Awards was held on November 30, 2014.

Voting Process
The voting opened during the time that the noontime variety show, ASAP released its official nominees for the year's awards show on October 5, 2014. Fans can vote in four ways: through ASAP's official website; mobile voting; print, and KakaoTalk. Voting was supposed to end on November 24, 2014, but it was extended until the next day on November 25.

Winners and Nominees
Winners are listed first and highlighted in boldface.

Multiple awards

Artist(s) with multiple wins
The following artist(s) received two or more wins (excluding the special awards):

*Films/TV Series of the artists are not included in the counts.

Artist(s) with multiple nominations
The following artist(s) received more than 2 nominations:

*Films/TV Series of the artists are not included in the counts.

Presenters and performers
The following individuals and groups, listed in order of appearance, presented awards.

 Marvin Agustin and Jolina Magdangal 
 Doris Bigornia and Dors Bigornia (Aaliyah Belmoro)
 John Lapus and Jason Gainza

Notes

References

External links 

 Asap Pop Viewers' Choice Awards official website

2014 in the Philippines
ASAP
ASAP
ASAP
ASAP (TV program)